20th Century Masters – The Millennium Collection: The Best of The Jackson 5 is a 1999 greatest hits album for R&B group The Jackson 5, released by Motown Records. The album also features two solo tracks by Michael Jackson and one solo track by Jermaine Jackson.

Critical reception
Stephen Thomas Erlewine from Allmusic said this album was "a terrific, concise collection of the group's 11 biggest hits", with two solo Michael Jackson singles. It resulted "a budget-line disc ideal for budget-minded casual fans."

Track listing

Chart performance 
The album failed to chart in Billboard at its original release year 1999. But in 2009, after Michael Jackson's sudden death, it charted and peaked at Number 8 on Billboard Catalog Albums chart issued dated  July 25, 2009. And in 2012, this album charted in Billboard 200, and peaked at Number 114 at the week of February 18, 2012.

As of August 2013, the album has sold 1,063,000 copies in the US.

Charts

References

1999 greatest hits albums
The Jackson 5 compilation albums
Motown compilation albums
Jackson 5
Universal Music Group compilation albums